Michael Gregory may refer to:

 Michael Gregory (actor) (born 1944), American actor
 Michael Gregory (jazz guitarist) (born 1953), American jazz guitarist
 Michael Gregory (Royal Navy officer) (born 1945), former Royal Navy officer
 Michael Gregory, member of the American musical group The Gregory Brothers
 Mike Gregory (1964–2007), rugby league player and later coach
 Mike Gregory (darts player) (born 1956), English professional darts player

See also